Alessio Hyseni (born 4 January 1997) is an Albanian footballer who plays as a midfielder for Italian club Ovidiana Sulmona.

Club career

Early career
Hyseni started his youth career at A.C. Perugia. In 2014, he gained entry at primavera team and in the 2014–15 season he scored 4 goals in 14 games. On 25 August 2015 Perugia loaned him to Serie D side U.S. Gavorrano. He was planned to stay at Gavorrano until the end of the season but after 9 appearances and 1 goal, on 6 February 2016 he resolved his contract with club and returned to Perugia.

Flamurtari Vlorë
On 31 August 2016 Hyseni signed with Flamurtari Vlorë. He played initially with Flamurtari Vlorë B, where he debuted with "Red and blacks" on 14 December 2016 in the Albanian Third Division against Sopoti Librazhd B playing the full 90-minutes match.

In the first half of the 2018–19 season, Hyseni found more space to play under Ilir Daja, collecting 14 league appearances and also providing 4 assists, joint fourth highest in the league. However, on 4 January, the club announced that they have terminated the contract with the player, thus leaving him a free agent at the day of his 21st birthday.

Partizani Tirana
On 4 January 2019, on the same day, Hyseni was announced as the new player of Partizani Tirnana, penning an 18-month contract with an option to renew.

International career
Hyseni was initially part of Albania under-17 side where he was invited by coach Dzemal Mustedanagić to participate in the qualifying round of 2014 UEFA European Under-17 Championship in October 2013. Hyseni played as a starter in the opening match of the Group 1 against Romania on 18 October 2013; he was substituted off in the 72nd minute for Arlind Demaj as the match was lost 1–0.

Then in the next two matches Hyseni played both as full 80-minutes as Albania defeated Belarus 2–1 and took a goalless draw against Finland, which were enough to clinch a spot into the elite round. He continued to be part of the team in the elite round in March 2014. In the first match against Italy on 26 March 2014, Hyseni played as a starter and was substituted off in the 63rd minute for Amarildo Gjoka as the team lost 2–1 despite scoring first with Keidi Bare in the 14th minute. Then he played two other matches as full 80-minutes as Albania U17 lost at both and got eliminated from tournament.

He advanced at the under-19 team as he was invited by coach Altin Lala to participate in the Friendly Tournament Roma Caput Mundi in Rome, Italy between 8–13 March 2015 against Malta, Wales and Italy. He was able to score in his debut against Italy on 12 March, netting the opener as the team won 2–0.

Career statistics

References

External links
 
 Alessio Hyseni profile at FSHF.org

1997 births
Living people
People from Castiglione del Lago
Italian people of Albanian descent
Footballers from Umbria
Albanian footballers
Albania youth international footballers
Association football midfielders
Serie D players
Kategoria Superiore players
Kategoria e Tretë players
U.S. Gavorrano players
Flamurtari Vlorë players
FK Partizani Tirana players
Sportspeople from the Province of Perugia